Pajaro (Spanish Pájaro 'bird') is an unincorporated community and census-designated place (CDP) in Monterey County, California. The population was 2,882 at the 2020 census, down from 3,070 in 2010. The school district is in Santa Cruz County.

Geography
Pajaro lies in the Pajaro Valley, with the Pajaro River forming the community's and the county's northern boundary. The city of Watsonville is across the river to the northwest, Santa Cruz County.

History 
The Pajaro post office operated from 1872 to 1873 and from 1882 to 1888.

The oldest building in the community is the Porter-Vallejo Mansion. Constructed in the 1840s and remodeled multiple times, it was acquired in 1991and converted into a public library/senior citizen center. It also houses a day-care facility for the children of migrant farm workers. Supervisor Del Piero, a Pajaro native, also secured major federal grants to acquire and completely rebuild the public water system in 1984, and transferred it to the newly created Pajaro Community Services District.

On Monday, May 11, 1903, President Theodore Roosevelt stopped in Pajaro for a ten-minute whistle-stop address on his way to Santa Cruz. He arrived in his special train via the Southern Pacific at 8:50am and left at 9:00am.

The town was heavily flooded in 1995, 1998, and 2023.

Transportation
A proposed Pajaro/Watsonville station is expected to be built at Watsonville Junction for Caltrain and Amtrak's Capitol Corridor.

Demographics

2010
The 2010 United States Census reported that Pajaro had a population of 3,070. The racial makeup of Pajaro was 1,451 (47.3%) White, 15 (0.5%) African American, 78 (2.5%) Native American, 53 (1.7%) Asian, 0 (0.0%) Pacific Islander, 1,281 (41.7%) from other races, and 192 (6.3%) from two or more races. Hispanic or Latino of any race were 2,889 persons (94.1%).

The Census reported that 2,979 people (97.0% of the population) lived in households, 91 (3.0%) lived in non-institutionalized group quarters, and 0 (0%) were institutionalized.

There were 621 households, out of which 444 (71.5%) had children under the age of 18 living in them, 409 (65.9%) were opposite-sex married couples living together, 86 (13.8%) had a female householder with no husband present, 57 (9.2%) had a male householder with no wife present.  There were 41 (6.6%) unmarried opposite-sex partnerships, and 3 (0.5%) same-sex married couples or partnerships. 46 households (7.4%) were made up of individuals, and 19 (3.1%) had someone living alone who was 65 years of age or older. The average household size was 4.80.  There were 552 families (88.9% of all households); the average family size was 4.82.

The population was spread out, with 1,067 people (34.8%) under the age of 18, 432 people (14.1%) aged 18 to 24, 970 people (31.6%) aged 25 to 44, 471 people (15.3%) aged 45 to 64, and 130 people (4.2%) who were 65 years of age or older.  The median age was 25.6 years. For every 100 females, there were 124.1 males.  For every 100 females age 18 and over, there were 134.3 males.

The homeowner vacancy rate was 1.4%; the rental vacancy rate was 3.2%.  620 people (20.2% of the population) lived in owner-occupied housing units and 2,359 people (76.8%) lived in rental housing units.

2000
As of the census of 2000, there were 3,384 people, 634 households, and 571 families residing in the CDP. The racial makeup of the CDP was 42.94% White, 0.47% African American, 1.65% Native American, 1.51% Asian, 0.35% Pacific Islander, 48.29% from other races, and 4.79% from two or more races. Hispanic or Latino of any race were 94.24% of the population.

There were 634 households, out of which 66.9% had children under the age of 18 living with them, 67.5% were married couples living together, 14.5% had a female householder with no husband present, and 9.9% were non-families. 6.3% of all households were made up of individuals, and 3.0% had someone living alone who was 65 years of age or older.  The average household size was 5.28 and the average family size was 5.25.

In the CDP, the population was spread out, with 39.6% under the age of 18, 15.5% from 18 to 24, 30.3% from 25 to 44, 10.4% from 45 to 64, and 4.2% who were 65 years of age or older.  The median age was 23 years. For every 100 females, there were 119.5 males.  For every 100 females age 18 and over, there were 124.2 males.

The median income for a household in the CDP was $38,315, and the median income for a family was $37,083. Males had a median income of $17,384 versus $17,917 for females. The per capita income for the CDP was $9,893.  About 20.4% of families and 22.2% of the population were below the poverty line, including 23.8% of those under age 18 and 5.0% of those age 65 or over.

Infrastructure 
Some public services in the Community of Pajaro are provided by the Pajaro-Sunny Mesa Community Services District (PSMCSD) which was organized by the Monterey County Board of Supervisors in 1984. PSMCSD, a non-profit, governmental agency, provides public water services, public sewer services, park services, and street lighting services to the community. PSMCSD has also significantly expanded its service areas to provide water services to the Prunedale, Elkhorn, and Moss Landing communities of North Monterey County. Between 1984 and 1990, Supervisor Del Piero secured federal grant funds that re-constructed and expanded major portions of the Pajaro County Sanitation District sewer system. This remedied multiple public health problems and extended services to the Bay Farms, Fruitland, and Las Lomas neighborhoods.

References

Census-designated places in Monterey County, California
Census-designated places in California